Tirupathur or Tirupattur is the headquarters of Tirupathur district in the state of Tamil Nadu in India and is one of the oldest inhabited places in the state, with a history of over 1,600 years. The town is known for an abundance of sandalwood in the surrounding hills.

History
From inscriptions surveyed by the Archaeological Survey of India in Tirupathur, it is estimated that the town is more than 1,600 years old. Under the Chola, Vijayanagara, and Hoysala dynasties, the town was variously called Sri Mathava Chaturvedi Mangalam, Veera Narayana Chaturvedi Mangalam, Tiruperur, Brahmapuram and Brahmeeswaram.

Tirupathur means "Ten Towns". It is a Taluk, with villages such as Aathiyur (Beginning) and Kodiyur (Ending). It has many ancient Vishnu and Shiva temples, and water tanks built during the Hoysala Dynasty. It is well connected by road and rail to the other important cities of Tamil Nadu such as Vellore, Chennai, Salem, Coimbatore and Thiruvannamalai and to Bangalore in Karnataka. The town has the resting places of many Islamic saints. As of 2011, the town had a population of 64,125.

Tirupathur was a revenue sub-division during the British colonial rule. It was a part of the Salem district, and later of Vellore district. The Tirupathur sub-division includes Tirupathur, Nattrampalli, Vaniyambadi and Ambur taluks. Anna Rajam Malhotra, India's first female Indian Administrative Service (IAS) officer, K P S Menon Jr., former foreign secretary to Prime Minister Narendra Modi, and Dr. T V Somanathan were sub-collectors of Tirupathur during their initial career.

In 1886, the Tirupathur municipality was constituted as a grade three municipality. As per the government order No. 194 dated 10.02.1970, it was reclassified as a second grade municipality. At present, as per the government order No. 654 dated 1.4.1977, it has been reclassified as a first grade municipality.

Tirupattur's population and land area are good enough to have political representations in the state legislature of Tamil Nadu (Member of the Legislative Assembly), and part of Thiruvannamalai constituency for the Lok Sabha (Member of Parliament as of 2009 elections).

As of 15 August 2019, the trifurcation of Vellore district resulted in the formation of the Tirupathur district, with Tirupathur town as its headquarters.

Geography
Tirupathur is called "Sandalwood Town" due to the abundance of sandalwood trees in the surrounding hills. It is very close to the Yelagiri hills, a major hill station of Tamil Nadu. The Jawadhu Hills, a part of the eastern ghats, are to the east of Tirupathur. The major group of soils found in the town are black (10 percent) and red (90 varieties). Tirupathur town has  of roads.

Climate
Tirupathur is known for recording the coolest temperature in the Tamil Nadu plains during winter. The seasonal climate conditions are moderate and the weather is uniformly salubrious. The town experiences sweltering summers and warm winters. The town gets the majority of its rainfall during the south west monsoon period. The town also experiences fairly frequent thunderstorms in late April and May, which gives necessary relief from the heat, along with a dip in night temperatures. The highest 24‑hour precipitation is  received on 4 November 1966. The climate is classified as tropical. In winter, there is much less rainfall than in summer. This climate is considered to be a tropical savanna climate (Aw according to the Köppen–Geiger climate classification).

Demographics

According to 2011 census, Tirupathur had a population of 83,612 with a sex-ratio of 1,010 females for every 1,000 males, much above the national average of 929. A total of 7,255 were under the age of six, constituting 3,717 males and 3,538 females. Scheduled Castes and Scheduled Tribes accounted for 18.33% and 0.43% of the population respectively. The average literacy of the town was 76.22%, compared to the national average of 72.99%. The town had a total of 14,084 households. There were a total of 22,895 workers, comprising 240 cultivators, 161 main agricultural laborers, 1,145 in household industries, 18,782 other workers, 2,567 marginal workers, 38 marginal cultivators, 27 marginal agricultural laborers, 246 marginal workers in household industries and 2,256 other marginal workers. As per the religious census of 2011, Tirupathur (M) had 81.93% Hindus, 16.39% Muslims, 1.52% Christians, 0.03% Sikhs, 0.02% Buddhists, 0.11% Jains, 0.00% following other religions and 0.01% following no religion or did not indicate any religious preference.

Politics 
Since 2016, Tirupattur assembly constituency is represented in the Tamil Nadu Legislative Assembly by A Nallathambi of DMK party. He was re-elected in 2021.  

Tirupattur is part of Tiruvannamalai Lok Sabha constituency. The present MP (elected in 2019) of the Tiruvannamalai Lok Sabha Constituency is Annadurai.

Places to see

Yelagiri is a hill station on the Vaniyambadi–Tirupathur Road, midway between Chennai and Bangalore. Jalagambarai waterfalls the most popular waterfall in Tiruattur and Vellore district is located behind the Yellagiri Hills. The Jalagambarai falls is located 10 kms from Tirupattur town which attracts several tourists from Bengaluru and Chennai along the weekends.

In the middle of this hill lies the Vainu Bappu Observatory (also known as Kavalur Observatory), which has several optical and reflective telescopes run and governed by the Indian Institute of Astrophysics.

Transport

The Tamil Nadu State Transport Corporation (TNSTC) provides 85% of transport facilities to this town. Tirupathur is well connected by road and rail to major cities of India. Regarding transportation linkage, the highway (NH 46) from Chennai to Krishnagiri (via) Nattrampalli passes through the town. The town is separated from Chennai, Bangalore, Vellore and Salem. Several state highways connect the town from Dharmapuri, Krishnagiri, Vaniyambadi, Harur, and Salem. Frequent buses are available to Chennai, Vellore, Harur, Salem, Bangalore, and Villupuram.

The Tirupathur railway junction is under the administrative control of the Southern Railways which is the beginning boundary of Salem Railway Division. To the north,  which is the second-biggest railway station in Tamil Nadu. It is the nearest junction, and to the south-west, Morappur is the next station. Due to proximity to the Jolarpettai railway junction, only a few express trains halt here.

The nearest airports are at Salem and Vellore, while the nearest international airports are at Bengaluru and Chennai.

References

External links
 Tirupathur official website

Cities and towns in Tirupathur district